Sarangesa bouvieri, commonly known as Bouvier's elfin, is a species of butterfly in the family Hesperiidae. It is found in Guinea, Sierra Leone, Liberia, Ivory Coast, Ghana, Togo, Nigeria, Cameroon, Gabon, Angola, Uganda, western Kenya and north-western Tanzania. The habitat consists of dry forests and successional habitats.

Adults are attracted to flowers.

The larvae feed on Acanthaceae species.

References

Butterflies described in 1877
Celaenorrhinini
Butterflies of Africa
Taxa named by Paul Mabille